Elizabeth Kolbert (born 1961) is an American journalist, author, and visiting fellow at Williams College. She is best known for her Pulitzer Prize-winning book The Sixth Extinction: An Unnatural History, and as an observer and commentator on the environment for The New Yorker magazine. The Sixth Extinction was a New York Times bestseller and won the Los Angeles Times’ book prize for science and technology. Her book Under a White Sky was one of The Washington Post’s ten best books of 2021. Kolbert is a two-time National Magazine Award winner, and was awarded the BBVA Biophilia Award for Environmental Communication in 2022.  Her work has appeared in The Best American Science and Nature Writing and The Best American Essays.

Kolbert served as a member of the Bulletin of the Atomic Scientists' Science and Security Board from 2017 to 2020.

Early life 
Kolbert spent her early childhood in the Bronx; her family then relocated to Larchmont, where she remained until 1979.

After graduating from Mamaroneck High School, Kolbert spent four years studying literature at Yale University. In 1983, she was awarded a Fulbright Scholarship to study at Universität Hamburg, in Germany.

Career 
Elizabeth Kolbert started working for The New York Times as a stringer in Germany in 1983. In 1985, she went to work for the Metro desk. Kolbert served as the Times' Albany bureau chief from 1988 to 1991 and wrote the Metro Matters column from 1997 to 1998.

Since 1999, she has been a staff writer for The New Yorker.

She was awarded a Pulitzer Prize for The Sixth Extinction in 2015.

Personal life 
Kolbert resides in Williamstown, Massachusetts, with her husband, John Kleiner, and three sons.

Recognition
 2005 American Association for the Advancement of Science Journalism Award
 2006 National Magazine Award for Public Interest
 2006 Lannan Literary Fellowship
 2006 National Academies Communication Award
 16th Annual Heinz Award with special focus on global change, 2010
 2010 National Magazine Award for Commentary
 2010 Guggenheim Fellowship in Science Writing
 2015 Pulitzer Prize for General Nonfiction
 2016 Sam Rose '58 and Julie Walters Prize at Dickinson College for Environmental Activism
 2017 SEAL Environmental Journalism Award
Blake-Dodd Prize from the American Academy of Arts and Letters in 2017.

Bibliography

Books

Essays and reporting

Introductions, forewords and other contributions

Critical studies and reviews of Kolbert's work
Field notes from a catastrophe
 
The sixth extinction
 
Under a white sky
 
———————
Notes

References

External links 

 
 "An Interview with Elizabeth Kolbert", Natural Resources Defense Council (NRDC) 2006
 
“Focus 580; The Climate of Man,” 2005-05-27, WILL Illinois Public Media, American Archive of Public Broadcasting (GBH and the Library of Congress), Boston, MA and Washington, DC, accessed June 7, 2021.

American non-fiction environmental writers
American environmentalists
American women environmentalists
1961 births
Living people
American women journalists
American women non-fiction writers
Pulitzer Prize for General Non-Fiction winners
The New Yorker staff writers
Journalists from New York City
Writers from the Bronx
Yale University alumni
University of Hamburg alumni
People from Larchmont, New York
Jewish American journalists
20th-century American journalists
21st-century American journalists
20th-century American non-fiction writers
21st-century American non-fiction writers
20th-century American women writers
21st-century American women writers
People from Williamstown, Massachusetts
Mamaroneck High School alumni
21st-century American Jews
Environmental journalists